Amagerbro station is a rapid transit station on the Copenhagen Metro, located in the Sundbyøster district of Copenhagen. It opened in 2002.

The station serves the M2 line and connects with bus services. It is located between the Christianshavn and Lergravsparken stations. It is located in fare zone 1.

The station has bicycle parking facilities.

References

External links
 Amagerbro station on www.m.dk 
 Amagerbro station on www.m.dk 

M2 (Copenhagen Metro) stations
Railway stations opened in 2002
2002 establishments in Denmark
Railway stations in Denmark opened in the 21st century